The Gorakhpur Mahotsav, is an annual cultural festival, held in Gorakhpur, Uttar Pradesh, India. It is held every year in January. Since 2018, Mahotsav is organized in collaboration with the Department of Tourism (UP), Department of Culture (UP) and District Administration of Gorakhpur. Earlier editions were organized by District Administration of Gorakhpur.

History

1997
Gorakhpur Mahotsav was organized for first time in 1997 with efforts of prominent local businessman and then advisor to UP Tourism Protul Kumar Lahiri. In book "Shaharnama Gorakhpur", writer Dr Ved Prakash Pandey has provided reference of souvenir book of Gorakhpur Mahotsav 1997.

2001
Gorakhpur Mahotsav was organized in January 2001 at Town Hall Field. A quiz show on the pattern of Kaun Banega Crorepati was also organized for students.

2016
After a gap of 15 years, in 2016 Gorakhpur Mahotsav was organized in Deen Dayal Upadhyay Gorakhpur University on initiative of then Divisional Commissioner Mr. P. Guruprasad during 29 January-1 February 2016. Mahotsav was inaugurated by Deen Dayal Upadhyay Gorakhpur University then Vice Chancellor Prof. Ashok Kumar and Inspector General  H.R. Sharma.

2018
After a gap of two years, in 2018 Gorakhpur Mahotsav was organised between 11–13 January 2018. Venue for the inauguration and most of the cultural events was Deen Dayal Upadhyay Gorakhpur University. Singer Shaan and Shankar Mahadevan performed on day 1 and day 3 respectively. Mahotsav was inaugurated by then Uttar Pradesh Governor Ram Naik at University Campus on 11 January and closing ceremony was attended by Uttar Pradesh Chief Minister Yogi Adityanath at Smriti Bhavan in Gorakhnath Temple on 13 January.

2019
In 2019 Gorakhpur Mahotsav was organized between 11–13 January 2019. Venue for the event was same as 2018, Deen Dayal Upadhyay Gorakhpur University.

2020
The 2020 Gorakhpur Mahotsav was organized between 11–14 January 2020. Originally it was scheduled for 11–13 January 2020, but due to national mourning observation after death of Sultan of Oman Qaboos bin Said all programs for 13th postponed to 14 January. Mahotsav was inaugurated by Uttar Pradesh Governor Anandiben Patel and closing ceremony was attended by Uttar Pradesh Chief Minister Yogi Adityanath. On the sidelines, Shilp Mela (eng. Crafts Fair) was also organized between 11–17 January showcasing local folk dances and artisans.

Singer Sonu Nigam was supposed to perform on 13 January, but his event was postponed to 14 January. Later he withdrawn from performance and did not return his fees (4 millions INR) with GST. After a discussion with organizing committee, he agreed to perform in Gorakhpur Mahotsav 2022 under same fees.

2021
The 2021 Gorakhpur Mahotsav was organized on 12–13 January 2021. Due to Covid-19 Pandemic Mahotsav was of two days duration, instead of three. Mahotsav was inaugurated by Uttar Pradesh Tourism Minister Neelkanth Tiwari on 12th and Uttar Pradesh Chief Minister Yogi Adityanath was chief guest in closing ceremony on 13th. This year venue of opening and closing ceremony was changed to Champa Devi Park near Ramgarh Tal Lake. Live telecast of Mahotsav was broadcast on LED screens at Shastri Chowk, Kutchery square, Mohaddipur square and Ramgarh Tal and also online through Mahotsav's website. As part of Mahotsav Dog Show was organized in Mahant Digvijaynath Park on day 1. Singer Maithili Thakur performed on day 2 of Mahotsav. A live exhibition on Guru Gorakhnath, Swami Vivekanand, Mahatma Gandhi and famous personalities of Poorvanchal region was organized between 12–16 January at Champa Devi Park, along with Agriculture, Garden, Book & Saras Fair and Science Exhibition.

During closing ceremony 'Gorakhpur Ratna' awards were distributed to talents from different walks of life. Awardee includes Singer Nandu Mishra (Art), Dr Sanjeev Gulati (Social Service), Dr Narendra Mohan Seth (Health), Dr Ram Chet Chaudhary (Agricultural Science), Jyoti Maskara (Business), S.M. Ali Saeed, Prem Maya (Sports), Prof. Dr. Meenakshi Narain (Science) and Amarnath Yadav (Wrestling). Motorized tricycles were distributed to 100 handicapped persons.

See also
 Maghar Mahotsav
 Basti Mahotsav

References

External links 
 

Festivals in Uttar Pradesh
Culture of Gorakhpur